Lightning, Show Us Your Stuff is the tenth studio album by Grant-Lee Phillips. It was released on September 4, 2020, through Yep Roc Records. The album debuted at #9 on Billboard's Americana/Folk Albums Chart, #11 on Top New Artist Albums (Heatseekers) and #28 on Current Rock Albums.

Background 
The title for Phillips' tenth album is inspired by the words of his young daughter as she once screamed "Come on lightning, show us your stuff" while thrusting a branch at the night sky. In this album the singer-songwriter addresses the fragility of life; addressing such a deep topic with a sense of intensity and humor. Phillips himself said, "There's definitely a questioning - I notice it on my more direct or confessional songs like 'Mourning Dove'. I think about the people we are when we come into the world, how we get beat up along the way and sometimes corrupted in pursuit of some brass ring. As the line goes, the things we chase that can't be kept. I'll admit it's that nagging tendency to question everything that inspires a song like 'Drawing the Head' and even when I'm writing through the voice of a character, as I am with 'Straight to the Ground'."

Critical reception 
Lightning, Show Us Your Stuff was met with "generally favorable" reviews by critics. The review site Metacritic gives a weighted score out of 100 based on reviews found in publications, and Phillips' album earned a score of 79 based on 6 critic reviews.

Lee Zimmerman, of American Songwriter, said, "It is, in short, an album for the ages, and a record that's representative of Phillips in all his prolific prowess."

Mojo gave the album a 4 star review, saying, "Phillips' latest beguiles with all the wiles of a master songwriter...A late-onset triumph."

Daniel Kohn, of Spin, said that in "Lightning, Show Us Your Stuff, his 10th studio album, [Phillips] continues to build on his gentle songwriting that’s defined his career.”

AllMusic gave Phillips' album 3.5/5 stars while saying, "Lightning Show Us Your Stuff doesn't feel like one of the truly great albums in Grant-Lee Phillips's catalog, but it's certainly a very good one, and any artist who can reliably turn out music this smart, impassioned, and well-crafted is someone who more than deserves a larger audience."

Track listing

Personnel 
Musicians
 Grant-Lee Phillips: Vocals, Guitars, Piano, Organ
 Jay Bellerose: Drums, Percussion
 Jennifer Condos: Bass
 Eric Heywood: Pedal Steel, Guitars
 Danny T. Levin: Euphonium, Trombonium, Coronet

Production
 Produced by Grant-Lee Phillips
 Recorded and Mixed by Pete Min at Lucy's Meat Market, Los Angeles, CA
 Mastered by Kimberly Rosen at Knack Mastering, Ringwood, NJ

References

2020 albums
Americana albums
Grant-Lee Phillips albums